The 2020 Formula D season (officially titled Formula Drift Pro Championship) was the seventeenth season of the Formula D series. The series began on September 5 at World Wide Technology Raceway and concluded on November 22 at Toyota Speedway at Irwindale after eight events.

Entries
2012 Formula D season champion Daigo Saito planned to return to the series after a four-year absence, but this never materialised.

Schedule
An initial schedule featuring eight championship rounds was released in November 2019, but this was revised in April 2020 to a different schedule still featuring eight rounds. A final calendar was announced in June 2020 featuring four double-header rounds.

The following rounds were included on the original calendar, but were cancelled in response to the COVID-19 pandemic:

Championship standings

Scoring system
Formula Drift featured double-header weekends throughout 2020 in order to maintain an eight-event schedule. This compressed the schedule of each event, so traditional qualifying was scrapped and replaced by a seeding process based on, but not limited to, championship standings, similar to the 2020 NASCAR Cup Series.

For this reason, points were only awarded for the main event, which features a maximum of 32 competitors. The competitors proceed through a series of competition heats, with those eliminated in the first round (Top 32) receiving 16 points and classifying 17th through 32nd, the second round (Sweet 16) receiving 32 points and classifying 9th through 16th, and the third round (Great 8) receiving 48 points and classifying 5th through 8th. The two drivers eliminated from the fourth round (Final Four) engage in a battle for the final step on the podium, with the fourth-placed driver receiving 64 points and the third-placed driver 76 points and a trophy. In the Final, the runner-up receives 88 points and the winner 100 points.

Final classification within each round was determined by highest seeding position; for example, of the four drivers eliminated in the Great 8, the driver seeded highest going into the event is awarded 5th position.

Pro Championship standings

Auto Cup standings
Auto Cup points are awarded each round to the two drivers with the highest classified finish for each manufacturer. To be eligible, both the chassis and engine must have been constructed by that manufacturer. For example, the Shelby Super Snakes entered by Tyler Nelson and Jonathan Nerren were not eligible for Ford points because their engines had been developed by Shelby American, the Nissan Silvia S15 entered by Aurimas Bakchis was not eligible because it featured a custom-built V8 engine, and the Nissan Silvia S14 entered by Chris Forsberg in the final round was not eligible for the same reason.

Tire Cup Standings
Tire Cup points are awarded each round to the two drivers with the highest classified finish for each tire manufacturer.

Footnotes

References 

Formula D seasons
Formula D